Hermann Geißler (5 July 1905 – 4 October 1970) was an Austrian sprinter. He competed in the men's 100 metres at the 1928 Summer Olympics.

References

External links

1905 births
1970 deaths
Athletes (track and field) at the 1928 Summer Olympics
Austrian male sprinters
Olympic athletes of Austria
Place of birth missing